Poken is a cloud-based event management platform, utilized by trade shows and exhibitions, corporate and association events, as well as sports and youth events. The modular platform includes features and services such as registration and badging, match-making, meeting scheduling, mobile apps, NFC interactive USB devices, lead generation devices, gamification, access control and metrics reporting.

History 

The company Poken S.A. was founded in December 2007 in Lausanne, Switzerland, by Stéphane Doutriaux. The founder had come up with the initial concept of an interactive USB device for sharing personal information and social networks by touch, while doing his MBA at IMD, a business school in Lausanne. This project was inspired by an application running on the IMD campus developed by Gabriel Klein 2004, one of the first employee of Poken The development of the technology was done in collaboration with the Berner Fachhochschule, a university of applied sciences situated in Biel, Switzerland. The project start was in July 2008 and ended in December of the same year . The first release of the interactive USB devices, called ‘Sparks’, was in January 2009. Since the initial development of the Poken 'Spark', the company has expanded its lines of products and services.

Poken had a network of partners and resellers in over 12 countries, with headquarters in London, Lausanne, Dubai and New York, and has delivered events in over 80 international locations. In 2017 it was acquired by GES.

Products and services

Poken is a modular, end-to-end platform, consisting of both software and hardware products. The Poken interactive USB device utilizes  Near Field Communication (NFC) technology to allow the exchange of online social networking data between two devices.  The primary information exchanged via the poken is a ‘social business card’, a digital replacement for a physical business card. By touching two devices together, a unique ID is exchanged that links to contact information on the Poken website. Contact information acquired by use of the poken can be uploaded to the poken website using a built-in USB connector. The user's poken contact card can contain any information they want to share, for example URLs, mobile number, email address, and location.  It can also be configured with links to the user on over 40 social networking sites.

When used in conjunction with Poken Touch points, the Poken interactive USB can collect digital content via touch, such as brochures and magazines, can interact with installations such as media walls and digital surveys, and can be used for access control and meeting check-in.

Awards

Swiss ICT Award- Best Newcomer, 2009
Tech Crunch Europa- Best Real World Gadget, 2009
Red Herring Europe- Top 100 Finalist, 2011
Mobile World Congress- Best Innovation in Mobile Advertising, 2012
E.X.C.I.T.E - Innovation in the Event Industry: Silver, 2012
GMIC Green Meeting Industry Award (GMIC NCC),2015
CTI/KTI Swiss Government Innovation Grant- 2016

References

Event management companies of Switzerland